Elena Dementieva is a Russian former professional tennis player. Throughout her career, Dementieva won sixteen WTA singles titles including two WTA Tier I singles titles, one WTA Premier 5 singles title and the gold medal in singles at the 2008 Beijing Olympic Games. She was also the runner-up at the 2004 French Open and 2004 US Open and a semi-finalist at the 2008 Wimbledon Championships, 2009 Australian Open and 2009 Wimbledon Championships. Dementieva was also a Silver Medallist in singles at the 2000 Sydney Olympic Games and a two-time semi-finalist at the year-ending WTA Tour Championships.

In October 2000, Dementieva reached her first career WTA singles final at the 2000 Sydney Olympic Games, where she lost in straight sets to Venus Williams and thus earned herself a silver medal. In April 2003, Dementieva rallied from a set down against Lindsay Davenport in the final of the Bausch & Lomb Championships to win her first career WTA singles title. The following year, Dementieva reached her first major singles final at the NASDAQ-100 Open where she lost in straight sets. Two months later, she reached her first grand slam singles final at the French Open but lost in straight sets to her compatriot, Anastasia Myskina in the first all-Russian grand slam final. In September of the same year, Dementieva reached her second grand slam singles final at the 2004 US Open but lost in straight sets to her compatriot, Svetlana Kuznetsova. From 2005 to 2007, the highlights of Dementieva's career were winning the 2006 Toray Pan Pacific Open and 2007 Kremlin Cup, a semi-final appearance at the 2005 US Open and quarterfinal appearances at the 2006 Wimbledon Championships and 2006 US Open.

In July 2008, Dementieva reached her first semi-final at the Wimbledon Championships but lost in straight sets to the eventual champion, Venus Williams. She rebounded by winning the gold medal in singles at the 2008 Beijing Olympics, defeating her compatriot, Dinara Safina in the final. Later that year, she reached her second consecutive grand slam semi-final at the US Open but lost in straight sets to the eventual runner-up, Jelena Janković. Dementieva finished the year by reaching the semi-finals of the WTA Tour Championships for the second time in her career where she lost in three sets to the eighth seed, Vera Zvonareva. Dementieva finished the year ranked World No. 4, which remains her best finish to date. Dementieva began the 2009 season by winning the ASB Classic and Medibank International, defeating her compatriots Elena Vesnina and Dinara Safina in the finals before reaching her first and only semi-final at the Australian Open where she lost to the eventual champion in straight sets. As a result, Dementieva has now reached the semi-finals or better at all four grand slam events. On April 3, 2009, Dementieva achieved a new career high singles ranking of World No. 3. Later that year, she reached her second consecutive semi-final at the Wimbledon Championships and won the Rogers Cup by defeating compatriot Maria Sharapova in the final in straight sets. In her final year, Dementieva reached the semi-finals of the 2010 French Open where she retired against eventual champion, Francesca Schiavone after losing the first set in a tie-break. Dementieva finished the year and her career ranked World No. 9.

Performance timelines

Only main-draw results in WTA Tour, Grand Slam tournaments, Fed Cup and Olympic Games are included in win–loss records.

Singles

Doubles

Grand Slam tournament finals

Singles: 2 finals (2 runner-ups)

Doubles: 2 finals (2 runner-ups)

Other significant finals

Summer Olympics finals

Singles: 2 medal rounds (1 gold medal, 1 silver medal)

WTA Tour Championships finals

Doubles: 1 final (1 title)

WTA Premier Mandatory & 5 finals

Singles: 10 finals (3 titles, 7 runner–ups)

Doubles: 5 finals (2 titles, 3 runner–ups)

WTA career finals

Singles: 32 (16 titles, 16 runner-ups)

Doubles: 13 (6 titles, 7 runner-ups)

ITF Finals

Singles: 4 (3 titles, 1 runner-up)

Doubles: 4 (3 titles, 1 runner-up)

WTA Tour career earnings
Dementieva earned more than 14 million dollars during her career.

Record against other players

No. 1 wins

Top 10 wins

Record against top 10 players 
Dementieva's win–loss record against certain players who have been ranked World No. 10 or higher is as follows:

''Players who have been ranked World No. 1 are in boldface.

Notes 

Dementieva, Elena